Zach Gill (born May 18, 1975) is a multi-instrumentalist singer-songwriter. He performs regularly as a solo artist in addition to being a member of Animal Liberation Orchestra and Jack Johnson's band. Gill has performed at festivals and on television shows around the world, including Saturday Night Live, Late Show with David Letterman, The Tonight Show with Jay Leno, Bonnaroo, Glastonbury, Live Earth, and at the 2008 United States Presidential inauguration ball.

Discography

Solo 
 Dogwood Forest EP (2005)
 Snowman's Philosophy EP (2006)
 Zach Gill's Stuff (2008)
 Roasting Chestnuts with Zach Gill (2013)
 Life in the Multiverse (2017)
 Cocktail Yoga (2020)

With Django 
 Contact (1993)
 Tabula Rasa (1994)
 The Fasting Showman single off Santa Barbara unsigned heroes volume? (1995)
 Django 4 song demo Django with David Brogan (1996)

With Animal Liberation Orchestra 
 The Animal Liberation Orchestra and the Free range Horns Vs. L.A.G. (1998)
 One Size Fits All (1999)
 Expressions hot tub EP (2000)
 Time Expander (2002)
 Fly Between Falls (2004)
 Roses & Clover (2007)
 Man of the World (2010)
 Sounds Like This (2012)
 Tangle Of Time (2015)

With Jack Johnson 
 In Between Dreams (2005)
 Let it be sung single with Jack Johnson and Matt Costa (2006)
 Sleep Through the Static (2008)
 En concert  (2010)
 To the Sea (2010)
 From Here to Now to You (2013)
 All the Light Above It Too (2017)
 Meet the Moonlight (2022)

References

External links
 Official site

1975 births
Place of birth missing (living people)
American rock pianists
American male pianists
Brushfire Records artists
Living people
People from Saratoga, California
People from Isla Vista, California
21st-century American pianists
21st-century American male musicians